The Liethen Mill is a former watermill in the village of Kleinhennersdorf in the municipality of Gohrisch in Saxon Switzerland in East Germany. It is used today as a forest inn and bed and breakfast.

Geographical location 
The mill lies in a hollow between Krippen and Kleinhennersdorf in the Elbe Sandstone Mountains.

History 
The Liethen Mill was first mentioned in 1572 in the records. It was worked for over three centuries until 1900 and was then converted into an inn with overnight accommodation that was opened in 1901. In East German times the mill was used as a holiday home by the clock factory in Ruhla, before being reopened to the public again in 1989 as a restaurant and guesthouse.

External links 
Official homepage

Watermills in Germany
Buildings and structures in Sächsische Schweiz-Osterzgebirge
Saxon Switzerland